opened in Akita, Japan in 1989.

The collection includes many works of the Akita ranga school.

See also
 Akita Museum of Art
 List of Cultural Properties of Japan - paintings (Akita)

References

External links
  Akita Senshū Museum of Art

Museums in Akita Prefecture
Art museums and galleries in Japan
Art museums established in 1989
1989 establishments in Japan
Buildings and structures in Akita (city)